William Frederick Vilas (15 July 1853 – 15 August 1930) was a Canadian politician.

Born in East Farnham, Canada East,  Vilas was mayor of Cowansville, Quebec from 1911 to 1922. He was acclaimed to the Legislative Assembly of Quebec for Brome in a 1906 by-election. A Liberal, he was re-elected in 1908 and 1912. He was acclaimed in 1916. He was appointed to the Legislative Council of Quebec for Wellington in 1917. He served until his death in Cowansville, Quebec in 1930.

References

1853 births
1930 deaths
People from Montérégie
Quebec Liberal Party MLCs
Quebec Liberal Party MNAs